Gaylord is a city in Sibley County, Minnesota, United States, along the shore of Titlow Lake. The population was 2,305 at the 2010 census. Gaylord is the county seat.

Geography
Minnesota State Highways 5, 19, and 22 are three of the main routes through the community.

Climate

History
A commonly used trail to the Dakota Territory passed through the future site of Gaylord in the 1850s.

Gaylord was platted in 1881, and named for Edward W. Gaylord, a railroad official. A post office has been in operation at Gaylord since 1881.

Demographics

2010 census
As of the census of 2010, there were 2,305 people, 929 households, and 590 families living in the city. The racial makeup of the city was 87.6% White, 0.2% African American, 0.1% Native American, 1.2% Asian, 9.6% from other races, and 1.2% from two or more races. Hispanic or Latino of any race were 23.0% of the population.

There were 929 households, of which 31.5% had children under the age of 18 living with them, 48.2% were married couples living together, 10.1% had a female householder with no husband present, 5.2% had a male householder with no wife present, and 36.5% were non-families. 32.6% of all households were made up of individuals, and 16.7% had someone living alone who was 65 years of age or older. The average household size was 2.42 and the average family size was 3.05.

The median age in the city was 37.3 years. 27% of residents were under the age of 18; 8.2% were between the ages of 18 and 24; 23.6% were from 25 to 44; 22.6% were from 45 to 64; and 18.5% were 65 years of age or older. The gender makeup of the city was 49.2% male and 50.8% female.

2000 census
As of the census of 2000, there were 2,279 people, 897 households, and 592 families living in the city. The racial makeup of the city was 88.02% White, 0.18% African American, 0.61% Native American, 0.70% Asian, 9.78% from other races, and 0.70% from two or more races. Hispanic or Latino of any race were 17.38% of the population.

There were 897 households, out of which 29.9% had children under the age of 18 living with them, 54.0% were married couples living together, 8.7% had a female householder with no husband present, and 33.9% were non-families. 29.1% of all households were made up of individuals, and 16.5% had someone living alone who was 65 years of age or older.  The average household size was 2.45 and the average family size was 3.01.

In the city, the population was spread out, with 24.7% under the age of 18, 8.4% from 18 to 24, 24.6% from 25 to 44, 21.2% from 45 to 64, and 21.0% who were 65 years of age or older.  The median age was 38 years. For every 100 females, there were 97.1 males.  For every 100 females age 18 and over, there were 86.8 males.

The median income for a household in the city was $39,053, and the median income for a family was $45,750. Males had a median income of $29,167 versus $22,406 for females. The per capita income for the city was $17,048.  About 9.4% of families and 13.6% of the population were below the poverty line, including 21.5% of those under age 18 and 8.5% of those age 65 or over.

Employment
Michael Foods is Gaylord's largest employer, situated at the confluence of Highways 5 and 19 on the east edge of the town. The second-largest is Sibley County, of which Gaylord is the county seat.

References

External links

City Website

Cities in Minnesota
Cities in Sibley County, Minnesota
County seats in Minnesota
1881 establishments in Minnesota